This is a list of towns in Scythia Minor that were mentioned in ancient writings.

See also
List of ancient Thracian cities
List of Dacian cities
Peuce Island
STRATEG. Defensive strategies and cross border policies. Integration of the Lower Danube area in the Roman civilization

.
Scythia Minor